World Club 10s is a rugby union tournament played under rugby tens rules, and contested by professional clubs from around the world. Top-level teams from Africa, Asia, Europe, and Oceania, have played in the tournament since the first edition in 2014.

History

The first tournament was played in Singapore as the opening event of the new National Stadium in June 2014. The Auckland Blues of  New Zealand won the final by 10–5 after double extra time against Australia's ACT Brumbies. However, the event was overshadowed by a serious injury during the third-place playoff match that ended the rugby career of Welsh player Owen Williams.

After a hiatus in 2015, the tournament moved to Mauritius with Beachcomber as the new title sponsor for 2016. In an all-Australian final, the Western Force won the title by 7–0 to leave the ACT Brumbies as runner-up for a second time. The  from South Africa reached the final in 2017 and 2018, winning back-to-back titles against the Free State Cheetahs and Newcastle Falcons, respectively.

Champions

References

External links
Tens law variations World Rugby

Rugby tens
2014 establishments
Rugby union in Mauritius
Multi-national professional sports leagues